Hajipur Assembly constituency is an assembly constituency in Vaishali district in the Indian state of Bihar.  In the 2015 Bihar Legislative Assembly election, it will be one of the 36 seats to have VVPAT-enabled electronic voting machines.

Overview
As per the Delimitation of Parliamentary and Assembly constituencies Order, 2008, No. 123 Hajipur Assembly constituency is composed of the Hajipur (community development block), while Hajipur Assembly constituency is part of No. 21 Hajipur (Lok Sabha constituency) (SC).

Members of Legislative Assembly

Election results

2020

1977 Vidhan Sabha Elections
 Jagannath Pd. Yadav (JNP) : 39,392 votes    
 Moti Lal Sinha Kanan (INC) : 13,154

References

External links
 

Assembly constituencies of Bihar
Politics of Vaishali district
Hajipur